The Combination classification was a competition in the annual Giro d'Italia bicycle race. It was first introduced in the 1985 Giro d'Italia, where it was first won by the Swiss rider Urs Freuler. The classification was run annually until the 1988 Giro d'Italia, where the American Andrew Hampsten won the classification. The combination classification was replaced in the 1989 Giro d'Italia by the intergiro classification. The classification reappeared after an 11-year hiatus in 2001. It was the absent from the succeeding Giro d'Italia editions until it returned in 2006, where Paolo Savoldelli won the classification. The classification did not return in 2007, as it was replaced by the return of the Young rider classification.

For the 1988 and the 2006 editions of the Giro, the leader of the classification was awarded a blue jersey.

Combination classification standings

References

Giro d'Italia
Giro d'Italia
Italian sports trophies and awards